Olav Ulland (23 November 1910 – 7 June 2003) was a Norwegian-American ski jumper who competed during the 1930s and 1940s.

Career
He took 5th place at World Championships 1930 in Oslo. He coached the Italian ski jumping team at Winter Olympics 1936 in Garmisch-Partenkirchen and took over American national team year later.

In 1954, Olav Ulland co-founded a new ski club in Seattle, Kongsberger Ski Club, which still exists. From the beginning, the club operated with both ski jumping and cross country skiing, but since 1974 the club has operated only cross country skiing. The United States Ski Association awarded him the Julius Blegen Award in 1957. He was inducted into the US Ski Hall of Fame in 1981.

The Pacific Northwest Ski Association Regional Ski Association awards the Olav Ulland Award annually to the athlete of the year in the Nordic branches.

On 17 March 1935 he became the first man in history who jumped over hundred metres at Trampolino Gigante Corno d'Aola hill in Ponte di Legno, Kingdom of Italy; but he glided with his hands at 103.5 metres (340 ft) and it wasn't recognized as the world record.

Invalid ski jumping world record
First ever ski jump over 100 metres in history.

 Not recognized as official: touched the ground at world record distance.

References

External links 
 Pioneer ski shops: Seattle's Osborn & Ulland i Skiing Heritage Journal, juni 2006, s. 29-31 (forhåndsvist på Google Books)
 Skispringen.com: Weltrekord Skifliegen - complete list (foruminnlegg 5. mars 2009, redigert 16. juni 2009, besøkt 23. August 2011)
 Jens Jahn, Egon Theiner: Enzyklopädie des Skispringens. AGON Sportverlag, Kassel 2004. , s. 148
 Skiforeningen: Rekorder i Holmenkollbakken (ikke oppdatert, besøkt 23. August 2011)
 The Seattle Times: Home Of Sniagrab Going Out Of Business -- Osborn & Ulland Falls Victim To Big Sporting-Goods Chains (11. mars 1995, besøkt 23. August 2011)
 Kongsberger Ski Club: About the Club (besøkt 23. August 2011)
 Pacific Northwest Ski Association: 2009 – 2010 PNSA annual awards

1910 births
2003 deaths
Norwegian male ski jumpers
American male ski jumpers
Norwegian emigrants to the United States
People from Kongsberg
Sportspeople from Viken (county)